Steak and eggs is a dish of beefsteak and fried eggs in American cuisine. It is most typically served as a breakfast or brunch food.

Ingredients
Various types of beefsteaks can be used, such as ribeye, strip, sirloin and flank, among others. Additional ingredients may include bell pepper, garlic, onion, butter, salt, pepper, hot sauce, and other seasonings or condiments. Accompaniments may include various sauces, such as steak sauce, Worcestershire sauce, chimichurri and others.

Variations
Variations include steak and egg sandwiches, open sandwiches and steak and Eggs Benedict. A version of steak and egg salad uses greens such as arugula, poached eggs and steak.

In popular culture
Steak and eggs is the traditional NASA astronaut's breakfast, first served to Alan Shepard before his flight on May 5, 1961.

The meal is also the customary pre-landing breakfast of the United States Marine Corps.

See also

 List of beef dishes
 List of egg dishes
 List of steak dishes
 Lomo a lo pobre

References

Beef dishes
Egg dishes
Food combinations

Source: Easy Recipes
American cuisine